Goniobranchus verrieri is a species of colourful sea slug, a dorid nudibranch, a marine gastropod mollusk in the family Chromodorididae.

Distribution
This marine species was described from New Caledonia. It is recorded from localities in the Indo-West Pacific.

Description
Goniobranchus verrieri has a white mantle with a red margin and a yellow submarginal band. The gills and rhinophores are red with white edging. The length of the body varies between 18 mm and 30 mm.

References

External links
 Gastropods.com: Chromodoris verrieri; retrieved: 8 May 2012
 

Chromodorididae
Gastropods described in 1875